Viktor Sofroniev (born 4 April 1981) is a Bulgarian former professional footballer who played as a defensive midfielder.
His first club was Spartak Varna.

References

1981 births
Living people
Bulgarian footballers
First Professional Football League (Bulgaria) players
PFC Spartak Varna players
OFC Vihren Sandanski players
PFC Rodopa Smolyan players
PFC Belasitsa Petrich players
PFC Lokomotiv Mezdra players
FC Botev Krivodol players
PFC Beroe Stara Zagora players
PFC Minyor Pernik players
Association football midfielders